William C. Fowler, (March 10, 1809June 13, 1892) was a 19th-century American Boston maritime pilot. He is best known for being the oldest pilot in the pilot service having served for fifty years as a branch pilot. He was captain and owner of the pilot boat Florence. His nephew, Franklin Fowler was a well known Boston pilot.

Early life

Captain William Carlton Fowler was born in Wiscasset, Maine, on March 10, 1809. Fowler was married to Mary Ann Phaling and had five children. Fowler went to sea at eleven years old in a coasting trade vessel until 1822. He spent several years on the schooner Reunion, on the coast of  Labrador. He headed south to the Spanish Main and to South America and Liverpool. He was part owner of the schooner Sea Flower, and engaged in costal trade.

Career

Fowler served in the pilot service for fifty years as a branch pilot and was the oldest pilot in active service in the United States. He joined the pilot service in 1833 on the pilot boat Favorite, under Captain Benjamin Swett, where he stayed for one year. He was captain of John Perkins Cushing's pilot-boat Sylph, where he received a full "branch" pilot commission on March 3, 1835. The license was signed by Governor Levi Lincoln of the Commonwealth of Massachusetts). He skippered the Sylph at the 1835 yacht race.

Fowler was attached to the pilot-boats, Boston, Spy, under Captain Henry Gurney; Eden D. Jordan, Florence, and Hesper. In the winter of 1836, he, and other pilots, built a 65-ton schooner Relief.

In February 1844, Fowler was the pilot on the Cunard Line steamship Britannia, caught in ice in the Boston Harbor. He laid out the course for cutting a 150 foot wide channel through the ice. During the American Civil War, Fowler served on government vessels. He came up the bay with the ship Tamonian, that belonged to Thatcher Magoun, where he went precisely alongside the India Wharf. He helped obtain the funds to establish the Boston Pilots' Relief Society in 1876.

His favorite boat was the Florence, No. 6, named for his daughter, Florence Carlton Fowler. He was attached to the Florence pilot boat from 1881 to 1898. The Florence was 19th-century Boston pilot boat built in 1867 from a model by Dennison J. Lawlor. She was the oldest pilot-boat in the Boston service and had a reputation for being fast under sail. On March 11, 1890, Captain Fowler, the oldest pilot in New England, celebrated his 81st birthday.

Death

On June 12, 1892, Fowler died in Everett, Massachusetts. He was 83 years old. At his funeral, his casket was covered with 83 roses, one for each year of his life. His interment was at the Lougwood cemetery, Kennett Square, Pennsylvania.

See also
 List of Northeastern U. S. Pilot Boats

References

People from Boston
1809 births
1892 deaths
Sea captains
Maritime pilotage